Museum of the History of Riga and Navigation is housed by the Riga Dom Cathedral ensemble in the heart of the Old Riga, Latvia. It originated in 1773 as a private collection of Nikolaus von Himsel, a Riga doctor and, being one of the oldest museums in Europe, over the centuries it has grown into the largest collection of material evidence of the history of Riga.

The Premises 
During the reconstruction of the Riga Dom Cathedral in the 1890s, part of the former monastery was converted to serve the needs of the Dom Museum. It is the first building in the history of Riga to have been built for a museum, and the inscription on the museum front bears testimony to this. Within the premises there is the Column Hall, built in 1778 in the Classicism style, which housed the library until 1891. The hall is now being used for conferences and a historical 18th—19th centuries exhibition.
The Column Hall faces the 13th century groin vaulted gallery and the Riga Dom Cathedral yard, a remarkable Romanesque and Gothic monument of the kind in the Baltic states. The Riga Dom Cathedral ensemble itself is an aesthetic treat that provides information about different periods in the construction of Riga.

Exhibitions 
The museum exhibitions show the development of Riga from the ancient villages of Riga, to the ancient port in the 12th—13th century, to the period of the Hansa League in the 13th—16th centuries, then to Polish and Swedish rule in the 16th—17th centuries. The museum offers a unique exhibition of the life of citizens of Riga during the first period of Latvian independence from 1918—1940, as well as an opportunity to trace the history of Latvian navigation from ancient times to our days. The collections comprise ancient engravings with views of Riga, maps, plans, silver and porcelain, ship models, navigational instruments, a rich collection of objects for everyday use, clothing, decorative items and other things totalling half a million items. In addition to the navigational exhibits, the museum's permanent and temporary exhibitions, as well as its collections, provide information about the history of Riga from the earliest times to the present day.

Gallery

External links 

 Museum website

Museums in Riga
City museums
Maritime museums in Latvia
Museums established in 1773
History museums in Latvia